Chloroplast capture is an evolutionary process through which inter-species hybridization and subsequent backcrosses yield a plant with new genetic combination of nuclear and chloroplast genomes. For instance, 1) species A's (having chloroplast genome a and nuclear genome AA) pollen  hybridizes (backcross) to species B's (b and BB) ovule, yielding the 1st hybrid (F1) with chloroplast genome b and nuclear genome A (50%) and B (50%); 2) species A's pollen again hybridizes (backcross) to F1's ovule, yielding the 2nd hybrid (F2) with chloroplast genome b and nuclear genome A (75%) and B (25%); 3) species A's pollen again hybridizes (backcross) to F2's ovule, yielding the 3rd hybrid (F3) with chloroplast genome b and nuclear genome A (87.5%) and B (12.5%); 4) after further backcross generations, a plant is obtained with the new genetic combination (chloroplast genome b and nuclear genome A).

Known cases of chloroplast capture

Gymnosperm

 Juniperus (Cupressaceae) 
 Pinus (Pinaceae)

Angiosperm

 Quercus (Fagaceae) 
 Ruppia (Ruppiaceae) 
 Heuchera (Saxifragaceae)

References

Plant genetics
Hybridisation (biology)